Here Be Monsters is an original novel based on the U.S. television series Buffy the Vampire Slayer.

Plot summary

After Buffy kills twin teenage vampires, their vampire mother steps in to seek revenge for the death of her sons. The mother summons the goddess of Balance and Buffy is faced with a trial in order to save her life as well as her mother's. In this trial, Buffy discovers what she fears most and her love for her mom must triumph over the vampire mother's love for her dead sons.

Continuity

Supposed to be set late in Buffy season 3.

Canonical issues

Buffy comics such as this one are not usually considered by fans as canonical. Some fans consider them stories from the imaginations of authors and artists, while other fans consider them as taking place in an alternative fictional reality. However unlike fan fiction, overviews summarising their story, written early in the writing process, were 'approved' by both Fox and Joss Whedon (or his office), and the books were therefore later published as officially Buffy merchandise.

External links

Reviews
Slayerlit.us - Review of this book.
Litefoot1969.bravepages.com - Review of this book by Litefoot
Nika-summers.com - Review of this book by Nika Summers
Shadowcat.name - Review of this book

2000 fantasy novels
Books based on Buffy the Vampire Slayer